Boris Alexis Sagredo Romero (born 21 March 1989) is a Chilean footballer that currently plays for A.C. Barnechea as an attacking midfielder.

Club career

Colo-Colo
He made his debut on October 3, 2007, against Everton.  His name became somewhat of a household name among Colo-Colo supporters after the November 4, 2007, match against rival Universidad Católica.  He came on in the 76th minute for Gonzalo Jara and just a minute later gave an assist to Giovanni Hernandez for the lone goal of the match.  Then in the second match after that, Sagredo scored his first goal for Colo-Colo against Palestino.

Currently Sagredo is playing for the Chilean soccer team Palestino. Sagredo was moved to the club because frankly he did not fit in Astengo's large squad despite his incredible talent and speed, and the move was made on order to secure more playing time for the Chilean midfielder. Although Sagredo was disappointed with the transfer out of Colo Colo, he is still motivated to play football and hopes that one day he will move to a large club.

O'Higgins
In 2011, he was signed by O'Higgins.

International career
On February 19, 2008 Chile's U-18 squad took on Mexico's U-23 squad in an exhibition match.  Sagredo was ejected from the game in the '35 after receiving his second yellow card.  Chile lost 2-0.

Currently, 19-year-old Sagredo is a vital part of Chile's participation in the U-23 2008 Toulon Tournament where he scored a beautiful goal in Chile's 5-3 win against France, started in the 2-0 win against the Netherlands as well as Chile's 2-0 win against Japan.

Career statistics

Honours

Club
Colo-Colo
 Primera División de Chile (3): 2006 Clausura, 2007 Apertura, 2007 Clausura

Palestino
 Primera División de Chile (1): Runner-up 2008 Clausura

O'Higgins
 Primera División de Chile (1): Runner-up 2012 Apertura

International
 Toulon Tournament (1): Runner–up 2008

References

External links

1989 births
Living people
Chilean footballers
Chilean expatriate footballers
Chile international footballers
Club Deportivo Palestino footballers
Colo-Colo footballers
Ñublense footballers
Deportes Iquique footballers
O'Higgins F.C. footballers
Rangers de Talca footballers
San Luis de Quillota footballers
Santiago Wanderers footballers
ABC Futebol Clube players
A.C. Barnechea footballers
Chilean Primera División players
Primera B de Chile players
Campeonato Brasileiro Série C players
People from San Felipe, Chile
Association football midfielders
Chilean expatriate sportspeople in Brazil
Expatriate footballers in Brazil